Alan D'Angerio is an American make-up artist. He was nominated for an Academy Award in the category Best Makeup and Hairstyling for the film Philadelphia.

Selected filmography 
 Philadelphia (1993; co-nominated with Carl Fullerton)

References

External links 

Living people
Year of birth missing (living people)
Place of birth missing (living people)
American make-up artists